Konrad Seitz (born 1934) is a German academic and diplomat. He has studied Philosophy, History and Classical Philology in Munich and International Economics and International Law at Fletcher School (Tufts-Harvard, MA, 1967). In 1965 Dr. Seitz entered the German Foreign Service, and in 1975 he became a speechwriter for then-foreign minister Hans-Dietrich Genscher, a position he retained until 1987. Subsequently, he served as German ambassador to India, Italy and China.

Konrad Seitz was born in Munich. He is author of a number of books. His book China. Eine Weltmacht kehrt zurück made it into a top-10 listing of important business books by financial information service Bloomberg.

Publications
Die japanisch-amerikanische Herausforderung. Deutschlands Hochtechnologie-Industrien kämpfen ums Überleben, Munich: Bonn Aktuell, 1990. 
Glotz, Peter and Süssmuth, Rita, Die planlosen Eliten. Versäumen die Deutschen die Zukunft? (with Glotz, Peter and Süssmuth, Rita) Munich: Stiebner Verlag, 1992. 
Europa. Una Colonia Tecnologica?, Milan: Edizioni di Comunità, 1995.
Wettlauf ins 21. Jahrhundert. Die Zukunft Europas zwischen Amerika und Asien, Munich: Siedler Verlag, 1998. 
China - Eine Weltmacht kehrt zurück, Munich: Siedler Verlag, 2002.

External links/Sources
www.randomhouse.de
www.akademie3000.de
www.econ-referentenagentur.de

1934 births
Writers from Munich
Living people
The Fletcher School at Tufts University alumni
Commanders Crosses of the Order of Merit of the Federal Republic of Germany
Recipients of the Order of Merit of Baden-Württemberg
Ambassadors of Germany to India
Ambassadors of Germany to China
Ambassadors of Germany to Italy